Icelandic USA is a Newport News, Virginia, based company, and is one of the largest seafood companies in the United States.

External links
 Corporate Homepage
 Retail Product Site

Companies based in Newport News, Virginia